Coon Creek is a stream in Audrain and Montgomery counties in the U.S. state of Missouri. It is a tributary of the West Fork Cuivre River.

Coon Creek was so named on account of raccoons in the area.

See also
List of rivers of Missouri

References

Rivers of Audrain County, Missouri
Rivers of Montgomery County, Missouri
Rivers of Missouri